Dummer is a surname of Old English origin. It means those from Dummer, Hampshire.

Notables with this name include
 Edmund Dummer (naval engineer) (1651–1713), Surveyor of the Navy (1692–1699) and Member of Parliament for Arundel (1695–1698, 1701, 1702–1708)
 Edmund Dummer (lawyer) (1663–1724), English lawyer who was appointed "Clerk of the Great Wardrobe"
 Geoffrey Dummer (1909–2002), British electronics author and consultant
 Jeremiah Dummer (silversmith) (1643–1718), American silversmith
 Jeremiah Dummer (1681–1739), important colonial figure in New England who helped establish Yale College
 Phineas Cook Dummer (1787–1875), sixth mayor of Jersey City, New Jersey, United States
 Richard Dummer (1589–1679), early settler in New England
 Richard Arnold Dümmer (1887–1922), South African botanist
 Shubael Dummer (1636–1692), early settler in New England murdered in Candlemas Massacre at York, Maine in 1692
 Thomas Lee Dummer (1712–1765), English Member of Parliament for Southampton (1737–1741) and Newport (Isle of Wight) (1747–1765)
 Thomas Dummer (1739–1781), English Member of Parliament for Newport (Isle of Wight) (1765–1768), Yarmouth (1769–1774), Downton (1774), Wendover (1775–1780) and Lymington (1780–1781); son of Thomas Lee Dummer
 William Dummer (1677–1761), Acting Governor of the Province of Massachusetts Bay
 William Dummer (cricketer) (1847–1922), Sussex county cricketer
 William Dummer Powell (1755–1834), Canadian judge

See also 
Dummer family tree showing the relationships between many of the above

References

English toponymic surnames